International Hepato-Pancreato-Biliary Association (IHPBA) is a non-profit organization established in 1994 to focus on medical conditions and procedures related to the liver, pancreas and biliary tract.

History 
The organisation traces its origin to International Biliary Association (IBA), which was founded in 1978 in San Francisco.   The IBA became the International Hepato-Biliary-Pancreatic Association (IHBPA) and a World Association of Hepato-Pancreato-Biliary Surgery (WAHPBS) was also formed with the first meeting at Lund on 9–13 June 1986, with 600 nearly attendees.  These two organisations merged to become the IHPBA in 1994.

In 1999 the IHPBA established the journal HPB.  The organisation was incorporated in the United States in June 2001, and it established the Warren Research Fellowship in the same year.

World congress
Since the first meeting of the merged IHPBA in 1994, the Congresses have been held even years.
 June 1994: Boston, USA
 1996: Bologna, Italy
 1998: Madrid, Spain
 2000: Brisbane, Australia
 April 25–29, 2002: Tokyo, Japan
 2004: Washington, USA
 2006
 2008
 April 2010: Buenos Aires, Argentina 
 July 1–5, 2012: Paris, France 
 11th World Congress - Seoul, Korea - March 22 - 27, 2014
 12th World Congress - Sao Paulo, Brazil - April 20 - 23, 2016
 13th World Congress - Geneva, Switzerland - September 4 - 7, 2018
 Virtual Congress - November 27 - 29 2020
 Future meetings are planned for 2022 and 2024.

Related associations

Regional associations
Regional Associations currently affiliated with the
IHPBA include:
 Americas Hepato-Pancreato-Biliary Association (AHPBA), incorporated in the United States in November 1994, holding its first regional Americas Congress in 1997.
 Asian-Pacific Hepato-Pancreato-Biliary Association (A-PHPBA), incorporated in Hong Kong, its predecessor being the Asian Society of Hepato-Biliary-Pancreatic Surgery which held regional congresses in Asia from 1991.
 European Hepato-Pancreato-Biliary Association (EHPBA), incorporated in Germany in 2005, its predecessor being the European Chapter of the IHPBA, initiated European Congresses in the odd years in 1995.

National chapters
National Chapters variably affiliated with the IHPBA have existed in Argentina, Greece, Italy, Japan, and the United States for a number of years.

National Chapters have emerged in Brazil, Canada, China, the Czech Republic, Ecuador, Egypt, Germany, India, Italy, Korea, Scandinavia, South Africa and the United Kingdom.

See also 
 Hepato-biliary diseases
 Pancreatic diseases

References

External links 
 Website

Hepatology organizations
Organizations established in 1994